"Level Up'" is a song by English musician Sway, featuring uncredited vocals from the singer Kelsey McHugh. The track was first released in the United Kingdom through All Around the World on 8 April 2012 as the second single from Sway's third studio album, The Deliverance, although it was not ultimately included on the album. Produced by Flux Pavilion, "Level Up" premiered on 8 February 2012 – with BBC Radio 1's Zane Lowe naming it his "Hottest Record in the World".

Music video
A music video to accompany the release of "Level Up" was first released onto YouTube on 2 March 2012 at a total length of three minutes and eight seconds.

Track listing

Charts

Weekly charts

Year-end charts

Release history

References

2012 singles
Song recordings produced by Flux Pavilion
2011 songs
Sway (musician) songs
All Around the World Productions singles
Songs written by Sway (musician)
Songs written by Flux Pavilion